Paid in Full is a lost 1914 silent film drama directed by Augustus E. Thomas and starring Tully Marshall. It is based on a 1908 play by Eugene Walter.

The story was re-filmed just five years later as Paid in Full with Pauline Frederick.

Cast
Tully Marshall - Joe Brooks
Caroline French - Emma Brooks
Riley Hatch - Captain Williams (*as William Riley Hatch)
George Irving - Jimsey Smith (*as George H. Irving)
Winifred Kingston - Beth Harris
Hattie Russell - Mrs. Harrie
Irving Southard - The Detective
T. Tamamoto - Sato, Williams' valet
Alfred Sidwell - Mr. Harris

References

External links
 Paid in Full at IMDb.com

1914 films
American silent feature films
Lost American films
American films based on plays
American black-and-white films
Silent American drama films
1914 drama films
1914 lost films
Lost drama films
1910s American films